The 2012 Gwynedd County Council election took place on 3 May 2012 to elect members of Gwynedd Council in Wales. Seventy four council seats were up for re-election, however, no candidates were nominated for the Bryncrug/Llanfihangel ward, and a by-election was held in June 2012.

The Gwynedd election was on the same day as other 2012 United Kingdom local elections.

Results
The council shifted from Plaid Cymru majority to No Overall Control (Plaid had taken control of the council between elections). With no candidates nominated for the Bryncrug/Llanfihangel ward, a by-election was held in June 2012 and the outcome could have led to a Plaid majority had the Plaid candidate won. However, an independent won. Plaid remained holding exactly half of the total seats, per the table below:

|}

References

2012
Gwynedd